Lennox or Lenox is the given name of:

People

Lennox
 Lennox Alves (born 1956), Guyanese cricketer
 Lennox Berkeley (1903–1989), British composer
 Lennox Blackmoore (born 1950), Guyanese boxer
 Lennox Broster (1889–1965), South African surgeon
 Lennox Cato (born 1961), British antiques dealer 
 Lennox Clarke (born 1991), English professional boxer
 Lennox Cowie (born 1950), British astronomer
 Lennox Gordon (born 1978), American football player
 Lennox Grafton (1919–2017), one of the first women to be trained as an architect in Canada
 Lennox Lagu (1938–2011), South African general
 Lennox Lewis (born 1965), British boxer
 Lennox Miller (1946–2004), Jamaican athlete
 Lennox Mohammed, Trinidadian musician
 Lennox Napier (1928–2020), British Army officer
 Lennox Pawle (1872–1936), British actor
 Lennox Raphael (born 1939), Trinidadian writer
 Lennox Robinson (1886–1958), Irish writer
 Lennox Sebe (1926–1994), South African politician
 Lennox Sharpe (born 1953), Trinidadian musician
 Lennox Yearwood (born 1969), American activist

Lenox
 Lenox Baker (1902–1995), American orthopedic surgeon and athletic trainer
 Lenox Hewitt (1917–2020), Australian public servant
 Lenox Paul (born 1958), English bobsledder
 Lenox Shuman (born 1973), Guyanese politician

Fictional characters
 Lennox Elizabeth Scanlon, a teenage girl character from the TV show Melissa & Joey, played by Taylor Spreitler

English unisex given names
English-language unisex given names
Scottish unisex given names